Malalur  is a village in the southern state of Karnataka, India.

References 

Villages in Chikkamagaluru district